Atlanta Monster is an investigative journalism podcast hosted by Payne Lindsey. The series takes an in-depth look into the infamous Atlanta Child Murders, which occurred between 1979 - 1981 with over 25 victims murdered in Atlanta. The podcast was co-produced by Tenderfoot TV and HowStuffWorks.

On January 8, 2019, the podcast released a second season. Titled Monster: Zodiac, the second season explored the Zodiac murders. In January 2020, they launched a third season titled Monster: DC Sniper.

Series overview
The first season of the series explores the child murders that occurred in Atlanta during 1979-1981 and the mystery behind who was the culprit of all those killings. Besides discussing the topic of the crime, the series also explores the underlying racial tensions and separation between the white and black citizens of Atlanta at the time as the victims were all black children. The series also looks at the way the city and country reacted to the murders and the way the media portrayed the victims. The podcast takes a look into the way the investigation was handled, whether the suspect they caught was the real culprit, and the way the black and white community remembered the incident differently.

Later seasons explore other regions and times where serial killers were known to be on the loose.

Episodes

See also
List of American crime podcasts

References

External links 
 

Investigative journalism
Infotainment
Audio podcasts
2018 podcast debuts
Crime podcasts
American podcasts
1979 in Georgia (U.S. state)
1980 in Georgia (U.S. state)
1981 in Georgia (U.S. state)
1970s in Atlanta
1980s in Atlanta
Crime in Atlanta